John Stoughton was an English minister and historian. 

John Stoughton may also refer to:

John Stoughton  (MP) for Guildford
John Stoughton (clergyman)

See also

John Stourton (disambiguation)